The New Zealand Volleyball League is the major national volleyball competition for men in New Zealand, established in 1968. It is organized by New Zealand Volleyball Federation (VNZ).

History
In the 2018/19 season in NZV Men's Division one 12 teams has participated : Shirley Silverbacks, Harbour Raiders A, Pines Men, Pioneer Panthers A, Playaz A, South Auckland Orcas, East Coast Old Boys, Manawatu Rangers A, Tauranga Tigers A, Scorpions, Playaz B, Auckland USO A. The Championship title was won by Shirley Silverbacks who won the Final beating Harbour Raiders A in a (3:2) score single match.

Winners list

References

External links
New Zealand Volleyball Federation 

 

New Zealand Volleyball League
Volleyball in New Zealand